An Han-bong (Hangul: 안한봉, Hanja: 安漢奉; born October 15, 1968 in Haenam, Jeollanam-do) is a retired South Korean Greco-Roman wrestler.

He won the gold medal at the 1992 Summer Olympics in Barcelona.

References

External links

1968 births
Living people
South Korean wrestlers
Olympic wrestlers of South Korea
Wrestlers at the 1992 Summer Olympics
South Korean male sport wrestlers
Olympic gold medalists for South Korea
Olympic medalists in wrestling
Asian Games medalists in wrestling
Wrestlers at the 1990 Asian Games
Korea National Sport University alumni
Sportspeople from South Jeolla Province
World Wrestling Championships medalists
Medalists at the 1992 Summer Olympics
Asian Games gold medalists for South Korea
Medalists at the 1990 Asian Games